Asquith Boys High School is a government-funded comprehensive single-sex secondary day school for boys, located on Jersey Street, Asquith, an upper north shore suburb of Sydney, New South Wales, Australia. 

Established in 1960, the school enrolled approximately 730 students in 2018, from Year 7 to Year 12, of whom one percent identified as Indigenous Australians and 27 percent were from a language background other than English. The school is operated by the NSW Department of Education in accordance with a curriculum developed by the New South Wales Education Standards Authority; the principal is Bryce Grant.

The school's sister school is the Asquith Girls High School. Activities such as music, art, drama, debating, sport and strong participation in the Duke of Edinburgh's Award Scheme are included in the co-curricular program.

History
The site on which Asquith Boys High School was built was originally a citrus orchard owned by the Fear family, a Hornsby pioneer family. The name "Asquith" from which the suburb north of Hornsby, and subsequently the school, takes its name, was named in 1915 after the wartime Prime Minister of the United Kingdom, H. H. Asquith, who was later made the Earl of Oxford and Asquith. Before the land was acquired by the New South Wales Government in the 1950s, the land had become a cattle and horse paddock. Originally intended to be the site of the Hornsby Technical College, the Department of Education later decided to build Asquith Boys on its current site instead.

Construction of the school buildings began in late 1959 but it was realised that they would not be finished in time for the school's opening in 1960 and thus the half the first boys were housed in various sites around Hornsby while the other half were housed in Chatswood High School. By mid-1960, the A Block was complete and the school moved onto its present site on 24 June 1960. By 1961 the school had risen in size to 660 students, which was later to rise to 990 by 1962, and 30 teachers while E Block and the Assembly Hall were also completed. The  first principal was Mervyn Brown, who contributed to establishing school traditions by composing the school song "Grow in Wisdom". 

By the time the first prefects and captains were elected in 1964, the school had risen in size to 1073 students and 54 teachers. The school was officially opened on 7 August 1964 by the director-general of secondary education, A.W. Stephens. By 1965 the science, arts and music rooms in G Block had been completed. The cadet unit was also formed in 1967, only to be disbanded again in 1973 following the end of Commonwealth funding for cadet units. The 1970s also saw various changes including an expansion of the Library as well as repairs to E Block following a classroom fire.

The school's sister school is the Asquith Girls High School.

Notable alumni
 Daniel ArnamnartAustralian swimmer
 Lloyd Babb NSW Director of Public Prosecutions
 George Blackwoodsoccer player; played for Adelaide United
 Justin Hantable tennis player
 Leroy HoustonAustralian rugby union player
 Mike Kelly politician; former Australian Army lawyer and Member for Eden-Monaro
 Andrew Sayersdirector of the National Museum of Australia
 Jordan Smylieprofessional soccer player; played for the Central Coast Mariners

See also 

 List of government schools in New South Wales
 Asquith Girls High School
 Education in Australia

References

External links 
 

Public high schools in Sydney
School buildings completed in 1960
Educational institutions established in 1960
Boys' schools in New South Wales
1960 establishments in Australia
Asquith, New South Wales